Načeradec is a market town in Benešov District in the Central Bohemian Region of the Czech Republic. It has about 1,100 inhabitants. The historic centre of Načeradec is well preserved and is protected by law as an urban monument zone.

Administrative parts
Villages of Daměnice, Dolní Lhota, Horní Lhota, Novotinky, Olešná, Pravětice, Řísnice, Slavětín, Vračkovice and Zdiměřice are administrative parts of Načeradec.

Geography

Most of the municipal territory lies in the Křemešník Highlands, the northwestern part lies in the Vlašim Uplands.

History
The first written mention of Načeradec is from 1184.

Until 1918, Načeradec (previously Natscheradetz) was part of the Austrian monarchy (Austria side after the compromise of 1867), in the Beneschau bei Prag – Benešov district, one of the 94 Bezirkshauptmannschaften in Bohemia.

Sights
The Romanesque part of the Church of Saints Peter and Paul is from around 1120. Next to the church stands as a remnant of the church fortifications an old bastion from 1278, which is transformed into a bell tower. The bell in the bell tower is from 1512. There is also one of the rarest Czech sights, the Načeradský Missal from the 13th century.

Other sights include a Baroque castle from 1734, a town hall from 1738, and 13 chapels of the Stations of the Cross.

References

External links

Market towns in the Czech Republic